The year 2007 is the 11th year in the history of M-1 Global, a mixed martial arts promotion based in Russia. In 2007 M-1 Global held 4 events beginning with, M-1 MFC: Russia vs. Korea.

Events list

M-1 MFC: Russia vs. Korea

M-1 MFC: Russia vs. Korea was an event held on January 20, 2007 in Saint Petersburg, Russia.

Results

M-1 MFC: Northwest Championships

M-1 MFC: Northwest Championships was an event held on March 10, 2007 in Saint Petersburg, Russia.

Results

M-1 MFC: International Mix Fight

M-1 MFC: International Mix Fight was an event held on March 17, 2007 in Saint Petersburg, Russia.

Results

M-1 MFC: Battle on the Neva

M-1 MFC: Battle on the Neva was an event held on July 21, 2007 in Saint Petersburg, Russia.

Results

See also 
 M-1 Global

References

M-1 Global events
2007 in mixed martial arts